Banchari is a village in the mandal of Hodal, Palwal district, Haryana state, India.

References

Villages in Palwal district